Pawee Tanthatemee (born 22 October 1996) is a Thai professional footballer who plays as a centre back for Thai League 1 club Ratchaburi Mitr Phol and the Thailand national team.

International career
In June 2019.he was in the squad of Thailand for 2019 King's Cup.

In 2021 he was called up by Thailand national team for the 2020 AFF Championship.

Career statistics

International

International goals

Under-21

Honours

International
Thailand
 AFF Championship (1): 2020
Thailand U-21
 Nations Cup (1): 2016

References

External links
 

1996 births
Living people
Pawee Tanthatemee
Association football defenders
Pawee Tanthatemee
Pawee Tanthatemee
Pawee Tanthatemee
Pawee Tanthatemee
Footballers at the 2018 Asian Games
Pawee Tanthatemee
Pawee Tanthatemee